Bertil Ohlson (Bertil Gustaf Emanuel Ohlson 22 January 1899 – 6 September 1970) was a Swedish athlete who competed mainly in the men's decathlon. He competed for Sweden in the 1920 Summer Olympics held in Antwerp, Belgium in the Decathlon where he won the Bronze medal.

References

External links 
 Profile at the Swedish Olympic Committee
 Profile at Sports-Reference.com

1899 births
1970 deaths
Swedish decathletes
Olympic bronze medalists for Sweden
Athletes (track and field) at the 1920 Summer Olympics
Olympic athletes of Sweden
Medalists at the 1920 Summer Olympics
Olympic bronze medalists in athletics (track and field)
Olympic decathletes